Mohammed Chris Alli (born December 1944) is a retired Nigerian Army major general who served as Chief of Army Staff from 1993 to 1994 under General Sani Abacha's regime and was military governor of Plateau State Nigeria from August 1985 to 1986 during the military regime of General Ibrahim Babangida. Many years later, he was appointed interim administrator of the state during a 2004 crisis in the state following ethno-religious killings in Shendam, Yelwa Local Government.

Military career

On February 13, 1976, army coup plotters assassinated the then head of state, General Murtala Mohammed. Alli was investigated for involvement in the coup attempt, but was exonerated.
General Ibrahim Babangida appointed Alli military governor of Plateau State from August 1985 to 1986.
During the attempted coup against General Ibrahim Babangida by Major Gideon Orkar on 22 April 1990, Colonel Alli was commander of the 3rd Infantry Brigade in Kano. He instructed several army commanders to make counter-broadcasts, as he did himself. The attempted coup failed.
After the coup in November 1993, when President Ernest Shonekan was ousted by General Sani Abacha, Alli was appointed Chief of the Army Staff.
Abacha dismissed him from this post in August 1994.

Later career

In May 2004, Plateau state erupted in sectarian violence, which spilled over to Kano State.
It was reported that over 50,000 people had died.
President Olusegun Obasanjo declared emergency rule in the state and suspended Governor Joshua Dariye and the state assembly, appointing Alli as administrator.
Alli quickly developed the Plateau Peace Program, involving dialog between religious, ethnic and community leaders, and a statewide peace conference. He also gave an amnesty to holders of weapons and a reward for their turning in their arms.
Alli's measures were successful in calming the situation, and he handed back to civilian rule in November 2004.

Bibliography

See also
List of Governors of Plateau State

References

Living people
1944 births
Governors of Plateau State
Chiefs of Army Staff (Nigeria)
National Defence College, India alumni